Cirrochroa clagia is a species of butterfly of the family Nymphalidae which is found in Indonesia. It was described by Jean-Baptiste Godart in 1823.

Subspecies
Cirrochroa clagia clagia (Java)
Cirrochroa clagia clagina Fruhstorfer, 1906 (Sumatra)

References 

Vagrantini
Butterflies described in 1823